The Frank J. Wood Bridge (Also known locally as The Green Bridge) is a three span, through truss bridge crossing over the Androscoggin River between the towns of Topsham and Brunswick, Maine, on Route 201. Opened in 1932, the bridge was originally called the Brunswick-Topsham bridge (as was its predecessor) but was officially renamed the Frank J. Wood Bridge, after a local farmer who suggested the location.

History

 In 1931 the state of Maine commissioned Boston Bridge Works, of Boston, Massachusetts, to construct a new bridge over the Androscoggin river to replace the old Topsham-Brunswick Bridge that was deemed unsafe. The bridge was built to last one hundred years.

The Frank J. Wood bridge was built to withstand any future floods that may come its way. The great flood of 1936, encapsulating all of New England, destroyed part of the bridge, but it was rebuilt and at full operating capacity within a year.

In 1944 the rails from the tram line where paved over with asphalt, after the Maine Central Railroad abandoned the tracks in 1937.

Namesake

Frank J. Wood, (born Joseph Franklin Wood September 15, 1861 – 11 April 1935) was born to Roy M. and Mehitable Potter Wood. A former employee of Bowdoin Paper Co., Wood became the proprietor of Long View Farm on Augusta Rd. in Topsham, Maine. Wood wanted to extend his customer base to Brunswick, however the preceding bridge was destroyed by a flood in 1929 and was deemed condemned. Before the bridge was built, Frank Wood petitioned the state to move the location of the new bridge slightly from where the older bridge was located. His efforts rewarded him with the bridges namesake. Wood died only four years after the opening of the Frank J. Wood Bridge.

Previous bridges

There have been several bridges since the colonial days that have been adjacent to the site of Fort Andross, just below Brunswick Falls, on the Androscoggin river, separating the towns of Topsham and Brunswick, Maine.

The First Bridge, as it was called, was built in the summer of 1796. It was built with wood and was swept away from a freshet (flood) in 1811. The 1811 Bridge was a second wooden bridge that was built, but was also swept away from a flood in 1827. The 1827 Bridge was a third bridge that was built of wood but with its foundation and piers made of stone. This bridge would also have a covered version but was destroyed by a fire in 1842. In 1871, the forth bridge was built open style, and was a toll bridge. Shortly after, it was jointly purchased and taken over by the towns of Topsham and Brunswick, and made toll free, and known as The Free Bridge. The fifth bridge, was built of light iron, but was swept away by yet another flood in 1896. The sixth bridge, In 1897 The Topsham-Brunswick Bridge was built with a heavier iron, but was pronounced condemned in 1927 after another flood.

National Register of Historic Places

After an initial review of the Bridge, in 2016, from the Maine DOT and the Federal Highway Administration, stating the bridge would not be eligible for the National Register of Historic Places, in 2017, they reevaluated and determined that the Frank J. Wood Bridge is eligible both as an individual historic place and as part of the Brunswick Commercial Historic District. Eligibility is based on its local significance in transportation for its significant association with regional interurban trolley lines. While most of the features associated with the interurban line are no longer withstanding, the standard width and height of the bridge, set specifically to accommodate the interurban line was adequate integrity to convey that significance.

A New bridge

Preliminary designs for a new bridge would be located slightly upstream of the current bridge, closer to the dam and would make it the eighth bridge to occupy the location since 1796.

References

Buildings and structures in Brunswick, Maine
Buildings and structures in Topsham, Maine
Bridges in Cumberland County, Maine
Steel bridges in the United States
Truss bridges in the United States
Androscoggin River
Bridges completed in 1932
1932 establishments in Maine
Bridges in Sagadahoc County, Maine

External links

 Frank J. Wood Bridge at bridgereports.com
 Frank J. Wood Bridge at bridgehunter.com
 The Historically Significant Frank J. Wood Bridge at YouTube